Privolzhsky District is the name of several various districts in Russia. The name literally means "something near the Volga".

Federal districts
Volga Federal District (Privolzhsky federalny okrug), a federal district

Districts of the federal subjects
Privolzhsky District, Astrakhan Oblast, an administrative and municipal district of Astrakhan Oblast
Privolzhsky District, Ivanovo Oblast, an administrative and municipal district of Ivanovo Oblast
Privolzhsky District, Samara Oblast, an administrative and municipal district of Samara Oblast

City divisions
Privolzhsky City District, a city district of Kazan, the capital of the Republic of Tatarstan

Military districts
Volga Military District (Privolzhsky voyenny okrug), a territorial association of the Soviet (1918–1989) and Russian (1992–2001) armed forces

See also
Privolzhsky (disambiguation)
Privolzhsk, a town in Ivanovo Oblast
Volzhsky (disambiguation)
Zavolzhsky (disambiguation)
Volga (disambiguation)

References